Sergey Vitalevich Loban (born September 3, 1972) - is a Russian film director and editor.

Filmography

As director
 Sluchay s patsanom (2001)
 Dust (2005)
 Chapiteau-show (2011)

As editor
 Chapiteau-show (2011)

References

External links

1972 births
Living people
Russian film directors